Zehntneria is a genus of stick insects belonging to the tribe Gratidiini.  The species of this genus are found in Central Asia and Southern Asia.

Species
GBIF lists:

Zehntneria desciscens 
Zehntneria mystica 
Zehntneria secundaria

References

Gratidiini